Kwan Tei is an area in the New Territories of Hong Kong. It is northeast of Lung Yeuk Tau and at the northwest of Lau Shui Heung, namely northwest of the major new town of Fanling.

Administration
Kwan Tei is a recognized village under the New Territories Small House Policy. For electoral purposes, Kwan Tei is part of the Queen's Hill constituency of the North District Council. It is currently represented by Law Ting-tak, who was elected in the local elections.

Geography
The area situates on a plain surrounded by hills at its north and south. The Ng Tung River, Tan Sha River and Kwan Tei River are major rivers in the area. The plain is fertile and suitable for farming with various villages.

Barracks
The name of Kwan Tei means "military place" in Cantonese. Barracks were built here by the British Army during the colonial era. To the west of Kwan Tei, Gailiopi Lines is located near San Wai, a walled village north of Lung Yeuk Tau. To the south, Burma Lines is on Queen's Hill. The Field Patrol Department of the Hong Kong Police Force is also near Queen's Hill.

Transportation
Kwan Tei was served by the Kwan Tei station of the former Sha Tau Kok Railway, which was in operation from 1911 to 1928. Kwan Tei station was opened in February 1916.

Sha Tau Kok Road goes through the heart of Kwan Tei, connecting Lung Yeuk Tau and Sha Tau Kok.

See also
 Ko Po Tsuen, North District
 Kwanti Racecourse
 Queen's Hill Estate

References

External links

 Delineation of area of existing village Kwan Tei (Fanling) for election of resident representative (2019 to 2022)
 Antiquities Advisory Board. Historic Building Appraisal. Yi Kung Lok Mansion, Kwan Tei Pictures
 Antiquities Advisory Board. Historic Building Appraisal. Sam Tung Uk, Kwan Tei North Tsuen Pictures

 
Populated places in Hong Kong
Villages in North District, Hong Kong